Sphaerocystidaceae is a family of chlorophyte green algae, in the order Chlamydomonadales.

Genera
, AlgaeBase accepted the following genera:
Dictyochlorella P.C.Silva – 3 species
Heleochloris Korshikov – 3 species
Korschpalmella Fott – 2 species
Planctococcus Korshikov – 1 species
Planochloris Komárek – 1 species
Sphaerocystis Chodat – 3 species
Topaczevskiella Massjuk – 1 species

References

Chlorophyceae families
Chlamydomonadales